Sir James Stanley Disney (17 June 1896 – 20 January 1952) was an Australian politician.

He was born in Ballarat to Arthur Disney and Isabella Christina Hill. During World War I he served with the Australian Flying Corps and was at Gallipoli. He then became a motor dealer, running his own company. In June 1924 he married Ruby Chapman. From 1935 to 1952 he served on Melbourne City Council. He was elected to the Victorian Legislative Council in 1940 as a United Australia Party member, representing Higinbotham Province; at this time his father still represented Melbourne West for the Labor Party. Disney was a supporter of Ian Macfarlan, and served in his brief ministry in October–November 1945 as Minister of Transport and Mines. He consequently lost Liberal endorsement in 1946 and was defeated. In 1948 he was elected Lord Mayor of Melbourne, serving until 1951; during this period he was closely involved with securing the 1956 Olympic Games for Melbourne. Knighted in 1951, Disney died in 1952 at Auburn.

References

1896 births
1952 deaths
United Australia Party members of the Parliament of Victoria
Liberal Party of Australia members of the Parliament of Victoria
Members of the Victorian Legislative Council
Mayors and Lord Mayors of Melbourne
Australian Knights Bachelor
20th-century Australian politicians